Yuan Guiren (born November 1950) is a Chinese academic and politician. He formerly served as Minister of Education of China and president of Beijing Normal University, his alma mater.

Biography
Yuan was born in Guzhen County, Anhui, in November 1950.

In October 2009, he succeeded Zhou Ji as Minister for Education, after the latter had been removed at a regular session of the National People's Congress.  He had previously served under Zhou Ji as a deputy minister.  At the first plenary session of the 12th National People's Congress in March 2013, he was re-elected.

He was a member of the 17th CPC Central Committee, the 17th Central Commission for Discipline Inspection (2007-2012), and a member of the 18th Central Committee.

References

External links
China Vitae Biography

 

1950 births
Living people
Ministers of Education of the People's Republic of China
Beijing Normal University alumni
People's Republic of China politicians from Anhui
Educators from Anhui
Politicians from Bengbu
Academic staff of Beijing Normal University
Chinese Communist Party politicians from Anhui
Presidents of Beijing Normal University